Spider-Man: Into the Spider-Verse is a 2018 American computer-animated superhero film produced by Columbia Pictures and Sony Pictures Animation in association with Marvel Entertainment, and distributed by Sony Pictures Releasing. It was directed by Bob Persichetti, Peter Ramsey, and Rodney Rothman based on a screenplay by Phil Lord and Rothman. The film is set in a shared multiverse called the Spider-Verse and focuses on Miles Morales (voiced by Shameik Moore), an Afro-Latino teenager who teams up with other Spider-Men from alternate universes to save New York City from the supervillain Kingpin (voiced by Liev Schreiber). It also features the voices of Mahershala Ali, Nicolas Cage, Brian Tyree Henry, Jake Johnson, John Mulaney, and Hailee Steinfeld. It is the first animated feature film in the Spider-Man franchise.

The film had its world premiere at the Regency Village Theater in Los Angeles on December 1, 2018, and was theatrically released in the United States on December 14. It grossed a worldwide total of $375.5 million on a production budget of $90 million. Review aggregator Rotten Tomatoes surveyed 375 reviews and judged 97% to be positive.

Spider-Man: Into the Spider-Verse garnered a variety of awards and nominations, many of them in the Best Animated Feature category. At the 91st Academy Awards, the film won Best Animated Feature. It also won the Golden Globe Award for Best Animated Feature Film, and the BAFTA Award for Best Animated Film. At the 46th Annie Awards, it received seven nominations, including Best Animated Feature and Best Writing in a Feature Production, and won in all its categories. The film won the Producers Guild of America Award for Best Animated Motion Picture. At the 17th Visual Effects Society Awards, it won four awards, including Outstanding Visual Effects in an Animated Feature.

Accolades

References

External links
 

Lists of accolades by film

Spider-Man lists